is a Japanese manga artist. He made his debut in 1971 under the pen name  writing shōnen manga, but he switched in the 1980s to seinen manga. He is best known for Natsuko's Sake, which was adapted as a live-action television series. Oze won the 1986 Shogakukan Manga Award for shōnen manga for Hatsukoi Scandal and Tobe! Jinrui II.

Selected works
  (1978, 1 volume)
  (1981–1986, 18 volumes)
  (1986–1987, 7 volumes) - story by Masao Yajima
  (1988–1991, 12 volumes)
  (1992–1994, 7 volumes)
  (1994–1997, 9 volumes)
  (2001–2004, 8 volumes)

References

External links
 Official Website 
 
 Profile at The Ultimate Manga Guide

Manga artists from Kyoto Prefecture
1947 births
Living people
People from Kyoto